The 2002 All-Ireland Minor Football Championship was the 71st staging of the All-Ireland Minor Football Championship, the Gaelic Athletic Association's premier inter-county Gaelic football tournament for boys under the age of 18.

Tyrone entered the championship as defending champions, however, they were defeated by Derry in the Ulster final.

On 22 September 2002, Derry won the championship following a 1-12 to 0-8 defeat of Meath in the All-Ireland final. This was their fourth All-Ireland title overall and their first in 13 championship seasons.

New format

Since its inception in 1929, the championship had always been played on a straight knock-out basis. If any team was defeated at any stage of the provincial or All-Ireland championships it meant automatic elimination. This system was deemed the fairest as the All-Ireland champions would always be the team who won all of their games.

After introducing a "back door" system in the All-Ireland Hurling Championship in 1997, a similar second chance system was now introduced for the football championship. Defeated provincial finalists would be allowed to re-enter the All-Ireland Championship at the quarter-final stage where they would be paired with a provincial champion and the chance to advance to the semi-final stage. While the format was criticised for giving a team no incentive for winning their respective provincial championship, the new format did provide an extra layer of games for developing young talent.

Results

Connacht Minor Football Championship

Quarter-Final

Semi-Finals

Final

Leinster Minor Football Championship

Rob Robin

Quarter-Finals

Semi-Finals

Final

Munster Minor Football Championship

Rob Robin

Semi-Finals

Final

Ulster Minor Football Championship

Rob Robin

Quarter-Final

Semi-Finals

Final

All-Ireland Minor Football Championship

Quarter-Finals

Semi-Finals

Final

Championship statistics

Miscellaneous

 Meath become the first beaten team to reach the All-Ireland final.

References

2002
All-Ireland Minor Football Championship